Toni Qattan (born 11 August 1985) is a Jordanian–Palestinian singer, songwriter, and producer. His musical talent was born to him, at the age of eight he began learning to play guitar in addition to piano. He then studied composing and singing. Qattan also holds a bachelor's degree in business management from the University of Applied Science in Amman.

Qattan is one of the first Jordanian artists to become popular in the Arab world without subscribing to hobbyist programs and is the first to produce songs of his own. This became a basis for many artists in Jordan who were encouraged to produce songs of their own after being traditionally confined to singing patriotic songs and covers of old songs.

Early life 
Qattan was born into a middle-class family, and despite the fact that his father worked as a civil engineer, he was interested in music dramatically and was interested in Toni's singing talent since childhood, where he brought to him music teachers, specialists in singing. Toni learned since his childhood playing the Oud and then moved to learn guitar and piano, as well as study Andalusian singing and old classic songs by professionals.

Qattan joined the University of Applied Sciences in Amman in 2003, where he wanted to study civil engineering like his father, but during the first year of his undergraduate studies, he met the poet Omar Sari and producer Khalid Mustafa, whom he cooperated with them in the production of songs of his own, and here began his career professionalism, as he changed his study and earned a Bachelor of Business Administration rather than engineering.

Music career 
Qattan started professional singing in 2005 where he presented a number of musical works:

In 2005, he released a single titled (Awedteni Sahar Allayali "I am used to the sleepless nights") of Bilal Alsurri's words and music by Toni Qattan, arrangement by Khaled Khawaldeh and it was filmed as a music video with the director Bilal Alsurri in the Luweibdeh – Jordan.

In 2006, he released 2 singles: (Men Dounek "without you") lyrics and composed by Toni Qattan arranger Khalid Mustafa was filmed in the area Ballouneh north of Beirut with director Hani Khashfe. (Eyouni Sehrani "My eyes are awake") of Shady Farah words and arrangement by Roger Abi Akl and was filmed with director Khashfe in the Chouf region in Lebanon.

In 2007, he released a single named (Eb'id O Rouh "Go away and leave me") written and composed by Bilal Alsurri and arranger Wissam Ghazzawi, it was filmed in an old bus garage in Beirut Lebanon.

In 2008, he released his first album produced by radio Fann and Mazzika productions, in the month of April titled (Malakshi Zai "No one is like you") which contains 10 tracks in cooperation with the poet Omar Sari and Bilal Alsurri and Abu Zaid Hassan and some of the songs were written by Toni himself, the music was all created by Toni Qattan and arrangement by Mustafa and Khawaldeh, "Malakshi Zai" song was filmed as a music video by the director Jad Sawaya in the Batroun – Lebanon. He also released in October of the same year, a single song entitled "Ahlef Yamin (I swear)", lyrics by the poet Sari, composed and arranged by Toni Qattan.

In June 2009 Toni was chosen to compose and sing a song named "Ahl Alhimmeh" the official song for an initiative of Queen Rania, which came on the occasion of the tenth anniversary of King Abdullah II constitutional powers, with the participation of the artist Omar Abdullat.

He released a single in March 2010 titled "Maghroum" written and composed by Toni Qattan and music arrangement by Haytham Kawar, it was filmed as a music video by Lebanese director Marc Karam. He also released a single song in October of the same year titled "Rouhi O Rohek" written, composed, and arranged by Wael Cherkaoui.

In 2011, he released a single song titled "Law Maktoub Alaya" written, composed, and arranged by Toni Qattan himself, a song talking about his suffering from the disease and expressing his feelings at the beginning of knowledge of his illness.

He released a single in February 2012 entitled "Afa Ya Ghali," a Gulf dialect song from the words of the poet Omar Sari and composed and arranged by Toni Qattan. He also issued a single in May of the same year titled "Alwaed" written, composed, and arranged by Wael Cherkaoui. In July of the same year, Toni released another hit single entitled "Gahotko Mashrouba" a Jordanian dialect song with lyrics and music and arrangement by Ali Khair.

In February 2013, he released a music video for his song "Afa Ya Ghali", which was filmed in Amman by director Rawhi Lotfi. In May of the same year, he released a single song entitled "Einha Alaya" with Lyrics by Abdul Rahman Asim and composed by Karim Ashour, and arranged by Mansi, which has been recorded in Cairo – Egypt.

in 2015
In January, he released a single titled "B'Ashek Sedkni", written by Areej Daou, composed by Salim Salameh and arranged by Rogy Khoury. It was recorded in Lebanon. He released a single song in April of the same year, titled “The Country Requested Its Own People,” composed by his lyrics and the bar, and arranged by Haitham Kawar. He released a song called “Bass Bass”, in late July of the same year. The song was written, composed and arranged by Tony Qattan himself, and it was recorded at Kawar Studios. He released a single titled “Sarti Halali”, written, composed and arranged by Wael El Sharkawy. At the end of 2015, he released a song called “Ah Ya Willy”, written by Sari, composed by Tony Qattan himself, and arranged by Saif.

in 2016
At the beginning of 2016, he released a song called “May God Have Mercy”, written by Omar Sari, composed by Tony Qattan, and arranged by Ahmed Rami. In February 2016, he released a song called “You Are Ante”, written and composed by Suleiman Abboud, and arranged by Mounir Jaafar. In March 2016, he released the song “You Shalltak Min Hayati” from his lyrics, the pub and its distribution.

in 2017
He released the song “Dunya Ma Tsawa”, written and composed by Mohamed Shaath, arranged by Youssef Beltagy and directed by Hammouda Saadeh. In 2017, he released a new video clip for the song “Ya Aeeb Al-Aeeb”, written, composed and arranged by Wael El Sharkawy, and filmed in collaboration with director Abdel Rahman Issa. He released the song “Yalli Betheb Elnana”. He released a single song entitled “Tal Al-Qamar”, written by Omar Sari, composed by Tony Qattan, and arranged by Mohamed Al-Qaisi.

Concerts and shows 
Toni Qattan participated in many festivals and concerts such as:

Jerash Festival - Jordan in 2016, 2018 and 2022
Dubai Expo - United Arab Emirates in 2021
Sixteenth Palestine Festival - Britain in 2021
Umm Qais Festival - Jordan in 2016
Ziryab International Festival - Malaysia in 2007 and 2008
Amman Summer Festival - Jordan in 2007, 2008, 2009, 2010, 2011, 2012, 2015, 2016 and 2017
Jordan Festival - Jordan in 2008 and 2009
Monte Carlo International Music Festival - 2007.
Palestine Summer Festival - Ramallah - Palestine in 2007
October Fest Festival - Shefa Amr - Palestine in 2017
Nablus Festival - Palestine in 2008
Sour Festival - Lebanon 2008
Orange Festival - Jericho - Palestine in 2011
Dead Sea Nights Festival - Jordan in 2011 and 2012
Heritage Festival in Birzeit - Palestine in 2012
Castle Nights Festival - Jordan in 2012 and 2017.
He participated in the song “Ya Biladi” with a group of Jordanian artists, which he performed in front of King Abdullah II Bin Al Hussein of Jordan at Al Husseiniya Palace in the Jordanian capital, Amman, on the day of the Kingdom’s 76th Independence Day celebration, on May 25, 2022.
He also performed a large number of concerts and festivals in Lebanon, Syria, Egypt, Palestine, Jordan, Qatar, Malaysia, Turkey, Sweden, Chile, the United States, Germany, the UK, the United Arab Emirates, and other countries.

Personal life
Qattan is the eldest son in his family. He has one brother and one sister. Toni Qattan is married to Jordanian media and television presenter Dana Abu Khader. Their wedding ceremony took place on 14 September 2011 in Amman, Jordan. Toni and Dana have two children, Gianna born in 2016, and George born in 2018.

Illness

Liver transplant
In 2010, Arabic press sources announced that Toni Qattan was suffering from cirrhosis of the liver. As per doctors, it was the result of organic autoimmune chronic disease possible to be born with called Primary Sclerosing cholangitis, which do not show symptoms until the final stages. At this point, the damaged liver had to be replaced via a liver transplantation given that there is no other treatment. The same sources said that Queen Rania Al-Abdullah of Jordan ensured Qattan's treatment at the King Hussein Medical City in Amman, yet no donor was found.
However, on 26 April 2014, Toni Qattan received a liver transplant in Niguarda Hospital in Milan, Italy. He recovered well from the surgery, is in good health now and he went back to his music and career.
Toni's wife Dana published a book to tell the story of his illness, the long wait for a donor, and his way to recovery. The book's title is 'على لائحة الانتظار', which can be translated as 'On the waiting list'.

Open-heart surgery
Media sources announced that Toni Qattan underwent open-heart surgery to replace the aortic valve, on November 27, 2022, in the Jordanian capital, Amman, and that he is in the recovery stage, according to a post published by his wife Dana Abu Khader on social media platforms.

References

External links 
 
Last FM Toni Qattan's Biography

Palestinian artists
1985 births
Living people
Jordanian male singers
Palestinian male singers
Jordanian people of Palestinian descent
Jordanian Christians
Palestinian Christians